Douglas "D.J." Swearingen, Jr. (born April 27, 1987), is a member of the Ohio House of Representatives, serving the 89th district since 2019. A Republican, Swearingen represents Ottawa and Erie counties. A graduate of Bowling Green State University where he played baseball, Swearingen went on to earn his law degree from the University of Dayton School of Law. A practicing attorney, Swearingen focused on real estate and business matters. Previously, Swearingen served as Chair of the Erie County Republican Party.

In 2019, Representative Steve Arndt announced his retirement and his desire to resign prior to the expiration of his term.  As a result, Swearingen was chosen by Ohio House Republicans to succeed Arndt. He was sworn into office on August 1, 2019.

References

Links 
 Representative D.J. Swearingen (official site)

Republican Party members of the Ohio House of Representatives
Bowling Green State University alumni
21st-century American politicians
Living people
1986 births
People from Toledo, Ohio
University of Dayton alumni